Protea aspera, commonly known as rough leaf sugar bush or aardroos suikerbos, is a flowering shrub that belongs to the well-known Protea genus. The plant is endemic to South Africa and is found in the Kleinrivierberge, Bredasdorpberge and Garcia's Pass.

The plant sprouts again after burning. The seed is released one to two years after flowers are formed and spread through the wind. The plant is unisexual. Pollination may occur through the action of mammals.

The plant is a vulnerable species.

References

aspera